Major League Baseball is a professional baseball league in Canada and the United States, and is widely regarded as the best league for the sport in the world. In addition, MLB is the best baseball league in the world in terms of revenue, and 85 countries are active in international competition per WBSC. Unlike FIFA, players do not register with a country, so nationality is often disputed when international fixtures come around, such as Manny Machado representing the Dominican Republic instead of the United States in the 2017 World Baseball Classic. Similarly, Alex Rodriguez played for the United States in the 2006 World Baseball Classic, but before the 2009 World Baseball Classic he announced his intention to play for the Dominican Republic (though ultimately he didn't play in the 2009 tournament due to injury). As such, player representation by birth spans to 25 countries as of the 2022 MLB season, with the United States topping the list at 1,057 players called up to 26-man rosters. The most represented overseas country is the Dominican Republic, with 171 players called up to 26-man rosters. The ranking for countries for most MLB players by birth matches well with the WBSC World Rankings, although East Asia and Australia underperforms in the MLB and European nations have little to no representation, likely due to acquisition fees, travel to home soil, and/or professional baseball leagues in their home country with good revenue.

Africa

Go Gators

Americas

Aruba

Bahamas

Brazil

Canada

Colombia

Cuba

Curaçao

Dominican Republic

Honduras

Mexico

Nicaragua

Panama

Peru

Puerto Rico

United States

United States Virgin Islands

Venezuela

Asia

Hong Kong

Japan

South Korea

Taiwan

Europe

Germany

Netherlands

Oceania

Australia

Guam

Footnotes

See also

List of countries with their first Major League Baseball player

References